Colors is the soundtrack album to the Dennis Hopper-directed 1988 action crime film Colors. It was released on April 26, 1988 via Warner Bros. Records and mostly consisted of hip hop music. The album found success, peaking at number 31 on the Billboard 200 and was certified gold on July 12, 1988, but it is best remembered for its title track performed by Ice-T. The single wasn't a huge success on the charts, only making it to #70 on the Billboard Hot 100, although it was later ranked the 19th best hip-hop song of all time by VH1 in 2008. The second song on the album, "Six Gun" by Decadent Dub Team was remixed for the album by Dr. Dre of NWA.

Track listing

Personnel
Benny Medina – executive producer
Dennis Hopper – executive producer
Steve Hall – mastering
Gary Goetzman – music supervisor
Sharon Boyle – music supervisor
Deborah Norcross – art direction & design
Jeri Heiden – art direction
David Skernick – photography
Merrick Morton – photography

References

External links

1988 soundtrack albums
Hip hop soundtracks
Albums produced by Marley Marl
Warner Records soundtracks
Albums produced by Afrika Islam
Action film soundtracks